Mangelia luctuosa is a species of sea snail, a marine gastropod mollusk in the family Mangeliidae.

Description

Distribution
This marine species occurs off the West Indies and the eastern part of Panama.

References

 d'Orbigny, Alcide Dessalines. Paléontologie universelle des coquilles et des mollusques: Avec un atlas. Atlas. Vol. 2. Gide, 1845.

External links
 

luctuosa
Gastropods described in 1894